Ivan Kotora (born 27 June 1991) is a Slovak football midfielder who currently plays for Tatran Liptovsky Mikuláš.

References

External links
 
 Futbalnet profile 
 MFK Ružomberok official club profile 

1991 births
Living people
Slovak footballers
Association football midfielders
MFK Ružomberok players
MFK Dolný Kubín players
MFK Zemplín Michalovce players
ŠKM Liptovský Hrádok players
MFK Tatran Liptovský Mikuláš players
Slovak Super Liga players
People from Levice
Sportspeople from the Nitra Region
2. Liga (Slovakia) players